Yoshitaki Hori (born 20 April 1933) is a Japanese speed skater. He competed at the 1956 Winter Olympics and the 1960 Winter Olympics.

References

1933 births
Living people
Japanese male speed skaters
Olympic speed skaters of Japan
Speed skaters at the 1956 Winter Olympics
Speed skaters at the 1960 Winter Olympics
People from Sakhalin Oblast